The Lavochkin La-152, (USAF reporting name - Type 4), and its variants, was a jet fighter prototype designed and manufactured by the Lavochkin Design Bureau (OKB) shortly after the end of World War II. Derived from the Lavochkin La-150, the 152 used several different engines, but the program was canceled as other fighters with more powerful engines and swept wings showed more promise.

Design and development

Izdeliye 152
Following the limited success of the 150, drastic changes were introduced to improve performance and ease of maintenance. This position minimized thrust losses due to the length of the intake duct and allowed the engine to be changed much more easily than its predecessor. The cockpit was widened and moved to a position over the mid-set wings, even with the engine's exhaust nozzle. The pilot's seat back was armored and he was protected by an armor plate to his front and a bulletproof windscreen. The removable, mid-mounted wings used several different laminar flow airfoils over their span. Each wing had a single spar, slotted flaps and ailerons. The tricycle undercarriage retracted into the fuselage, which meant that the aircraft had a very narrow ground track. The aircraft was armed with three  Nudelman-Suranov NS-23 autocannon, two on the starboard side of the aircraft's nose and the other on the port side. Each gun had 50 rounds of ammunition.

The 152 made its first flight on 5 December 1946 and the manufacturer's trials completed on 23 June 1947. State acceptance trials commenced on 12 July, but the prototype crashed on the eighth flight when the engine failed on approach. The maximum speed attained by the 152 before its crash was only .

Izdeliye 154
The Lavochkin OKB decided to improve the performance of the 152 in late 1946 by replacing the RD-10 engine with a more powerful Lyulka TR-1 turbojet of  thrust. The design work was completed in September 1947, and construction began of a prototype shortly afterward, but the engine was not yet ready for testing and the project was canceled. The only other significant difference from the 152 was that each cannon was furnished with 75 rounds of ammunition.

Izdeliye 156
Meanwhile, the OKB had been developing two afterburning versions of the RD-10 to increase the engine's power. The more successful model was only  longer and weighed an additional  more than the original engine. Its power, however, was increased by an additional , over 30% more thrust. This engine was designated the izdeliye YuF by the bureau and was fitted into an aircraft 152 prototype in November 1946, initially designated as the 150D (Dooblyor - Second). This was changed to Aircraft 156 the following month.

In addition to the more powerful engine, the aircraft now had an ejection seat, additional cockpit armor, and a revised canopy. More importantly, it was fitted with new wings with a greater span and more surface area; they also had a new airfoil designed to delay Mach tuck. The area of the tailplane and the vertical stabilizer was also increased. Two prototypes were built and the first one was completed in February 1947 and made its first flight on 1 March. The second prototype joined the manufacturer's trials later that month. One of these aircraft participated in the Tushino flypast on 3 August 1947, where it was given the USAF reporting name of Type 5. It could reach  in four minutes using afterburner. The aircraft was rejected by the Soviet Air Forces when the trials were concluded on 28 January 1948. The report said that the YuF engine was required more work before it was ready for production, the aircraft had problems with longitudinal stability, excessive stick forces from the ailerons and elevators, and the undercarriage was troublesome. Lavochkin consequently canceled the program.

Izdeliye 174TK
An experimental version of Izdeliye 156 was built in 1947 under the name of Izdeliye 174TK (Tonkoye Krylo - thin wing). The three NS-23 cannon had to be repositioned on the bottom of the nose to accommodate the engine. It reached an altitude of 5,000 meters in only 2.5 minutes, but even these impressive gains over the 156 were inferior to the swept-wing Lavochkin La-160 that had flown nine months earlier and the program was canceled.

Variants
 Izdeliye 154 - A second 152 airframe with a Lyulka TR-1 turbojet. Canceled due to delays with the engine.
 Izdeliye 156  - Originally known as Aircraft 152D. A modified 152 with a YuF engine, an afterburning version of the RD-10. 
 Izdeliye 174TK - A thin-wing version of the 156 with a Rolls-Royce Derwent engine, but performance was already overshadowed by the lower-powered Aircraft 160 so further development abandoned.

Specifications (Izdeliye 156)

See also

References

Notes

Citations

Bibliography

 Gordon, Yefim. Early Soviet Jet Fighters. Hinckley, Leicestershire, UK: Midland, 2002. .
 Green, William and Gordon Swanborough. The Complete Book of Fighters. London: Salamander Books, 1994. .
 Gunston, Bill. The Osprey Encyclopedia of Russian Aircraft 1875–1995. London: Osprey, 1995. .

La-152
1940s Soviet fighter aircraft
Single-engined jet aircraft
Mid-wing aircraft
Aircraft first flown in 1946